Schrader-Griswold Cottage is a historic cure cottage located at Saranac Lake in the town of Harrietstown, Franklin County, New York.  It was built around 1905 and is a -story, gable-roofed, wood frame dwelling with clapboard siding in the Queen Anne style.  It features a 2-story cure porch on half of the front facade and a 1-story verandah continuing across front and around the side.

It was listed on the National Register of Historic Places in 1992.

References

Houses on the National Register of Historic Places in New York (state)
Queen Anne architecture in New York (state)
Houses completed in 1905
Houses in Franklin County, New York
National Register of Historic Places in Franklin County, New York
1905 establishments in New York (state)